This is a list of notable people whose primary occupation is furniture design.

A
 Alvar Aalto (1898-1976)
 Eero Aarnio (born 1932)
 Robert Adam (1728-1792)
 Thomas Affleck (1745-1795)
 Franco Albini (1905-1977)
 Davis Allen (1916-1999)
 Ron Arad (born 1951)
 Ini Archibong (born 1983)
 David Armstrong-Jones, 2nd Earl of Snowdon (born 1961)
 Gae Aulenti (1927-2012)
 Jean Avisse (1723-1796)

B
 Fred Baier (born 1949)
 Edward Barber and Jay Osgerby (born 1969)
 Milo Baughman (1923-2003)
 Mario Bellini (born 1935)
 Harry Bertoia (1915-1978)
 Lina Bo Bardi (1914-1992)
 Cini Boeri (1924-2020)
 André Charles Boulle (1642-1732)
 Ronan and Erwan Bouroullec (born 1971 and 1976)
 Marcel Breuer (1902-1981)
 Jeremy Broun (born 2000)
 Busk + Hertzog

C
 Louise Campbell (born 1970)
 Achille Castiglioni (1918-2002)
 Wendell Castle (1932-2018)
 Don Chadwick (born 1936)
 William Chambers (1723-1796)
 Eliphalet Chapin (1741-1807)
 Thomas Chippendale (1718-1779)
 Thomas Chippendale, the younger (1749-1822)
 Antonio Citterio (born 1950)
 John Cobb (1715-1778)
 Kenneth Cobonpue (born 1968)
 Muriel Coleman (1917-2003)
 Joe Cesare Colombo (1930-1971)
 Henry Copland (1728-1754)
 Charles Cressent (1685-1768)

D
 Niels Diffrient (1928-2013)
 Nanna Ditzel (1923-2005)
 Tom Dixon (born 1959)

E
 Ray (1912-1988) and Charles Eames (1907-1978)
 Charles Eastlake (1836-1906)
 Olav Eldøy (born 1948)
 Paul Evans (1931-1987)

F
 Pierre François Léonard Fontaine (1762-1853)
 Paul T. Frankl (1887-1958)
 Naoto Fukasawa (born 1956)

G
 Peter Ghyczy (born 1940)
 Grinling Gibbons (1648-1721)
 Ernest Gimson (1864-1919)
 Eileen Gray (1878-1976)
 Hector Guimard (1867-1942)

H
 Christopher Guy Harrison (1960-2020)
 Ambrose Heal (1872-1959)
 George Hepplewhite (c. 1727-1786)
 René Herbst (1891–1982)
 James Hilton (born 1973)
 Matthew Hilton (born 1957)
 Jacques Hitier (1917-1999)
 Josef Hoffman (1870-1956)
 Thomas Hope (1769-1831)
 Luke Hughes (born 1957)
 Richard Hutten (born 1967)

J
 Arne Jacobsen (1902-1971)
 Dakota Jackson (born 1949)
 Charles Hollis Jones (born 1945)
 Hella Jongerius (born 1963)
 Finn Juhl (1912-1989)

K
 Vladimir Kagan (1927-2016)
 William Kent (1685-1748)
 Poul Kjærholm (1929-1980)
 Florence Knoll (1917-2019)
 Silas Kopf (born 1949)
 James Krenov (1920-2009)
 Shiro Kuramata (1934-1991)

L
 Max Lamb (born 1980)
 Charles-Honoré Lannuier (1779-1819)
 Paul László (1900-1993)
 Charles Limbert (1854-1923)
 François Linke (1855-1946)
 David Linley (born 1961)
 Piero Lissoni (born 1956)
 Mathias Locke (18th century)
 Samuel Loomis (1748-1814)
 Ross Lovegrove (born 1958)
 Fred Lowen (1919-2005)

M
 Sal Maccarone (born 1949)
 Charles Rennie Mackintosh (1868-1928)
 Vico Magistretti (1920-2006)
 Terence Main (born 1954)
 John Makepeace (born 1939)
 Sam Maloof (1916-2009)
 Cecilie Manz (born 1972)
 Enzo Mari (born 1932)
 Daniel Marot (1661-1752)
 Wendy Maruyama (born 1952)
 Bruno Mathson (1907-1988)
 Judy Kensley McKie (born 1944)
 Alessandro Mendini (1931-2019)
 Børge Mogensen (1914-1972)
 Thomas C. Molesworth (1890-1977)
 Carlo Mollino (1905-1973)
 Jasper Morrison (born 1959)

N
 George Nakashima (1905-1990)
 George Nelson (1908-1986)
 Marc Newson (born 1963)
 Nolen Niu (born 1975)
 Isamu Noguchi (1904-1988)
 Arne Norell (1917-1971)
 Wallace Nutting (1861-1941)

O
 Jean Francis Oeben (1721-1763)
 Jonathan Olivares (born 1981)
 Sergio Orozco

P
 Verner Panton (1926-1998)
 Kenneth Peacock (1922-2000)
 Charlotte Perriand (1903-1999)
 Charles Percier (1764-1838)
 Alan Peters (1933-2009)
 Duncan Phyfe (1768-1854)
 Warren Platner (1919-2006)
 Ferdinand Plitzner (1678-1724)
 Charles Pollock (1930-2013)
 Jean Prouvé (1901-1984)

R
 Ernest Race (1913-1964)
 Dieter Rams (born 1932)
 Karim Rashid (born 1960)
 Lilly Reich (1885-1947)
 Jean Henri Riesener (1734-1806)
 Gerrit Rietveld (1888-1964)
 Jens Risom (1916-2016)
 T. H. Robsjohn-Gibbings (1905-1976)
 David Roentgen (1743-1807)
 André Jacob Roubo (1739-1791)
 Alexander Roux (1813-1886)
 David Rowland (1924-2010)

S
 Eero Saarinen (1910-1961)
 Kasper Salto (born 1967)
 Richard Sapper (1932-2015)
 Sergio Savarese (1958-2006)
 Timothy Schreiber
 Frans Schrofer (born 1956)
 George Seddon (1727-1801)
 Maarten van Severen (1956-2005)
 Thomas Shearer (18th century)
 Thomas Sheraton (1751-1806)
 Alma Siedhoff-Buscher (1899-1944)
 Bořek Šípek (1949-2016)
 Janice Smith
 Rosanne Somerson (born 1954)
 Ettore Sottsass (1917-2007)
 Russell Spanner (1916-1974)
 Mart Stam (1899-1986)
 Philippe Starck (born 1949)
 Gustav Stickley (1858-1942)
 Bill Stumpf (1936-2006)
 Sympson (fl. 1660s)

T
 Michael Thonet (1796-1871)
 Matteo Thun (born 1952)
 Frederick William Tod (1879-1958)
 Johannes Torpe (born 1973)
 David Trubridge

U
 Patricia Urquiola (born 1961)

V
 Henry van de Velde (1863-1957)
 William Vile (c. 1700-1767)
 Lella Vignelli (1934-2016)
 Arne Vodder (1926-2009)

W
 Katie Walker (born 1969)
 Marcel Wanders (born 1963)
 Hans J. Wegner (1914-2007)
 Russel Wright (1904-1976)

Y
 Tokujin Yoshioka (born 1967)
 Michael Young (born 1966)

References

Lists of people by occupation
Design-related lists